Donald Richard Chelf (March 25, 1933 – July 16, 2019) was an American football player who played with the Buffalo Bills. He played college football at the University of Iowa.

Chelf died on July 16, 2019, in Tampa, Florida of lung cancer.

References

1933 births
2019 deaths
People from Muscatine County, Iowa
Players of American football from Iowa
American football tackles
Iowa Hawkeyes football players
Buffalo Bills players
American Football League players
Deaths from lung cancer